Chicago Transit Authority may refer to:

Chicago Transit Authority, the operator of mass transit within the City of Chicago, Illinois.
Chicago (band), formerly named The Chicago Transit Authority
The Chicago Transit Authority, eponymous album by the mentioned band

See also
 Chicago subway (disambiguation)